The discography of Icelandic singer-songwriter and musician Emilíana Torrini consists of six solo albums, one compilation album, one live album with the Colorist Orchestra, one album as a member of the Icelandic band Spoon and one collaboration album with Canadian musician Kid Koala, as well as multiple singles and collaboration songs. Her first two studio albums have been released only in Iceland by Japis Records. One Little Indian released her 1999 album Love In The Time Of Science. Her further releases are through Rough Trade Records.

Albums

Studio albums

Compilation albums
 Rarities - Released 2000, reissued 2010

Collaboration albums
 Spoon (1994) - with Spoon
 The Colorist & Emilíana Torrini (2016) - a semi-live album with The Colorist Orchestra
 Music To Draw To: Satellite (2017) - with Kid Koala

Singles

Other charting tracks

Other Tracks

References

Discographies of Icelandic artists